Memecylon pauciflorum is a tree species in the Melastomataceae family. It grows as a tree or shrub in northern Australia and tropical and subtropical Asia. An understorey species typically, it grows in a variety of communities. The possum Petropseudes dahli (rock-haunting possum) uses this species as one of their scent-marking sites. It is a host to a number of funguses. People in Australia and in Thailand use the plant in folk medicine, though no efficacy has been demonstrated.

Description
This plant grows as a tree or shrub, some 1-10m tall, with a trunk that does rarely exceeds 30cm d.b.h.
Many-branched, with smooth 4-sided branches. Leaves are around 3-7 by 1-3cm in size, with lateral veins barely visible on upper surface, but making inconspicuous loops or an intramarginal vein quite close to the margin, there are small oil dots visible at low magnification (e.g. with hand lens); stipules are absent, but scars are visible on twigs between petioles that resemble stipule scars; the upper surface of petiole is grooved. Inflorescences are shorter than leaves. Small pink/green flowers, about 2mm long petals; eight stamens; the anthers have a long spur at the base, which has a raised gland on opposite side to filament attachment. Globular, or depressed globular, fruit, some 6-8 by 8-9mm in diameter; persistent calyx at apex. Globular seeds, some 4-5 by 5-6mm in diameter. A seed weighs about 130mg. Green cotyledons that are crumpled and folded many times, more or less semiorbicular in seedling, some 16-20 by 15-30mm; shortly petiolate; stipules on cotyledons usually visible; winged hypocotyl. The glabrous leaves are linear and narrowly elliptic to elliptic at tenth leaf atage; usually visible stipules or stipule-like structures. The germination time of seeds is from 20 to 63 days. In the Kimberley, Western Australia it flowers in January and February or in April. In Zhōngguó/China it flowers in April and May, with fruiting occurring in November.

Characteristics that distinguish it from other Memecylon species in China are: that it is a shrub or small tree (less than 6m tall); the blade of the leaves are some 3.5-8 by 0.6-3.5 cm in size; the blade of the leaf is some 1.4-3.2 times as long as it is broad with a base not decurrent on petiole; the anther is connected abaxially with a circular concave gland; smooth and glossy leaf blade on both surfaces; fruit is not ribbed; cymose inflorescences; and again on both surfaces the leaf blade is glabrous and glossy.

Taxonomy

This species has been identified by molecular phylogenetics using nuclear ribosomal DNA as being in a Malesian/Southeast Asian/Chinese clade with Memecylon caeruleum, Memecylon cantleyi, Memecylon lilacinum, Memecylon plebujum, and Memecylon scutellatum.

This species was first described in 1851 by the Braunschweig-born botanist Carl Ludwig Blume (1796-1862). He spent his working life in now Indonesia, then the Dutch East Indies, where he was at the now Bogor Botanical Gardens, and in the Netherlands, where he was at the then Rijksherbarium, Leiden, now the Nationaal Herbarium Nederland, Leiden. He published a description of the plant in 1850, however the 1851 description in his work Museum botanicum Lugduno-Batavum, sive, Stirpium exoticarum novarum vel minus cognitarum ex vivis aut siccis brevis expositio et descriptio is held to be authoritative.on Botanicus

Distribution
This species is native to an area from northern Australia to tropical and subtropical Asia. Countries and regions in which this taxa grows are: Australia (Queensland, Northern Territory, Western Australia); Malaysia (Peninsular Malaysia); Vietnam; Zhōngguó/China (Hainan, Guangdong); Laos; Myanmar; Bangladesh; India (Andaman Islands). In Queensland, the tree/shrub occurs from southeastern region to the central- and north-east and Cape York Peninsula. In Western Australia it is found in the northern Kimberley.

Habitat, ecology
In Australia M. pauciflorum grows from near sea level to 400m in altitude. It is found as an understory tree in monsoon-, drier or more seasonal rain-, open- and littoral-forests and in woodlands. In the Kimberley, Western Australia, it grows on sandy soils, in sandstone gorges. In Zhōngguó/China it is found in forests and mountain slopes.

A publication of Queensland Herbarium on the broad vegetation groups present in that state of Australia includes a number of communities that include the species.  
The following table summarises the information.

The possum Petropseudes dahli (rock-haunting possum), uses this tree as a deposit for scent. Ten tree species, rocks and termite mounds were used for scent-marking. The scent is emitted by caudal glands on individuals rumps, cloacal secretions are possibly also involved. The secretion is orange-coloured, molasses-like in texture and has a sweet, musky odour, that humans can smell up to 50m away.

In the Kilim Karst Geoforest Park area (Langkawi, Malaysia), the plant grows in association with mangrove forests, it is moderately abundant.

It is a host to the following taxa: the pathogenic fungi Botryosphaeria purandharensis and Mycosphaerella multiloculata, and other fungi Acrocordiella occulta, Lecideopsella gelatinosa and Meliolina memecyli.

Vernacular names
cherry (Australian English)
少花谷木, shao hua gu mu (Standard Chinese)

Uses
In the traditional medicine of the Kuuku I’yu (Northern Kaanju) or Kaanichi Pama, the people of the inland highlands of central Cape York Peninsula, northeast Australia, the plant is used to treat skin infections and inflammations.  
Enzyme inhibitory activity, antiglycation activity and antioxidant activity of the species leaf extract was assessed and found not to be significant.

The Karen people of northern and western Thailand use the species in their ethnomedicine. A decoction of the leaves is drunk as treatment for muscle pain.

References

pauciflorum
Flora of Bangladesh
Flora of Guangdong
Flora of Hainan
Flora of Laos
Flora of Myanmar
Flora of Peninsular Malaysia
Flora of Queensland
Flora of the Andaman Islands
Flora of the Northern Territory
Flora of Vietnam
Flora of Western Australia
Plants described in 1851